VfB Stuttgart is a German sports club based in Stuttgart, Baden-Württemberg. The club is best known for its football team which is currently part of Germany's first division Bundesliga. VfB Stuttgart is one of Germany's most successful clubs. The club has won the national championship five times, most recently in 2006–07; the DFB-Pokal three times; and the UEFA Intertoto Cup a record three times.

List of players
Appearances and goals are for first-team competitive matches only, including Bundesliga, 2. Bundesliga, 2. Bundesliga Süd, DFB-Pokal, DFL-Supercup, DFL-Ligapokal, European Cup/Champions League, UEFA Cup/Europa League, Cup Winners' Cup and Intertoto Cup matches.

Statistics correct as of match played 9 June 2020

Table headers
 Nationality – If a player played international football, the country/countries he played for are shown. Otherwise, the player's nationality is given as their country of birth.
 VfB Stuttgart career – The year of the player's first appearance for Stuttgart to the year of his last appearance.
 Appearances – The total number of matches played, both as a starter and as a substitute.
 Goals – The total number of goals scored.

References 
General

Specific

VfB Stuttgart
 
Stuttgart, VfB
Association football player non-biographical articles